Kendall Lorraine Wesenberg (born 23 August 1990) is an American skeleton racer who competes on the Skeleton World Cup circuit.  Wesenberg attended the University of Colorado, where she studied business administration, and lives in Nashville, Tennessee. She began racing skeleton in 2014. Wesenberg was named, along with Katie Uhlaender, to represent the U.S. in women's skeleton at the 2018 Winter Olympics in Pyeongchang.

Notable results 
Wesenberg started competing internationally in 2014–15 on the Europe Cup circuit, winning her very first race, at Lillehammer. She went on, with three fourth-place finishes and two seconds, to become the first American woman to win the overall Europe Cup season rankings.

She moved immediately to the World Cup for the 2015–16 season, taking 15th place at the World Championships in Igls and 11th in the season rankings.  She took her first (and so far only) World Cup podium in 2017, with a silver medal at St. Moritz, and improved her World Championships performance to 13th at Königssee; also at the 2017 Worlds, she was on a team event (combined bobsled and skeleton) squad that finished 10th.

References

External links
 

1990 births
American female skeleton racers
Living people
Skeleton racers at the 2018 Winter Olympics
Olympic skeleton racers of the United States
Bisexual sportspeople
21st-century American women
LGBT skeleton racers